John Franklin Kerner (February 20, 1904 – 1951) was an American Negro league outfielder in the 1930s.

A native of Columbus, OH, Kerner played for the Indianapolis ABCs in 1931, and played for the club again in 1933 when it was known as the "Detroit Stars". He died in Columbus in 1951.

References

External links
 and Seamheads

1904 births
1951 deaths
Date of death missing
Indianapolis ABCs (1931–1933) players
Baseball outfielders
Baseball players from Columbus, Ohio
20th-century African-American sportspeople